Meet Me After the Show is a 1951 Technicolor musical film starring Betty Grable and released through 20th Century Fox. The film was one of Grable's last musical films for Fox during her box office reign of the past decade.

Plot
Delilah Lee (Betty Grable) is groomed by her husband Jeff Ames (Macdonald Carey) for his new Broadway show. Delilah becomes such a success to a point where she feels that Jeff thinks of her more as an asset than a wife. When the show's backer Gloria Carstairs (Lois Andrews) begins coming on to Jeff, Delilah leaves him, but regrets it later on and tries to win him back. She devises a scheme involving amnesia to lure Jeff back to her.

Cast
 Betty Grable as Delilah Lee
 Macdonald Carey as Jeff Ames
 Rory Calhoun as David Hemingway
 Eddie Albert as Chris Leeds
 Fred Clark as Timothy 'Tim' Wayne
 Lois Andrews as Gloria Carstairs
 Irene Ryan as Tillie
 Gwen Verdon as Sappho, Dancer in "No-Talent Joe" (uncredited)
 Arthur Walge as "No-Talent Joe"

Production
Betty Grable had been reigning the box office throughout the 1940s. Her films always made big money for 20th Century Fox and they rewarded her by increasing her salary over the years to a point where she was making more money than Fox head Darryl F. Zanuck. By the end of the decade she was making $300,000 a year which made her the highest paid person in Hollywood and one of the highest paid people in America. Meet Me After the Show was a box office hit when released, especially due to the successes of her two films the previous year; Wabash Avenue and My Blue Heaven.

Rory Calhoun co-starred in this movie. He would also co-star with Betty Grable in How to Marry a Millionaire in 1953 playing her romantic interest in that film.

Meet Me After the Show also features a supporting performance by Irene Ryan later of The Beverly Hillbillies fame. She played Grable's maid Tillie.

Gwen Verdon is an uncredited singer and dancer in some of the musical numbers composed by Jule Styne with lyrics by Leo Robin, including "No-Talent Joe" and "I Feel Like Dancing". In her only solo album, The Girl I Left Home For (1955), Verdon sang three songs from the film: It's a Hot Night in Alaska, Bettin' on a Man and No-Talent Joe.

Arthur Walge, a 6'6" former weightlifter and professional wrestler, plays the statuesque "No-Talent Joe" in a musical number performed by Betty Grable.

References

External links 
 
 
 
 

1951 films
20th Century Fox films
Films set in 1951
1950s romantic musical films
1950s musical comedy-drama films
1950s romantic comedy-drama films
American romantic comedy-drama films
American romantic musical films
American musical comedy-drama films
1951 comedy films
1951 drama films
1950s English-language films
1950s American films